Takashi Uto (born November 12, 1974, in Kagoshima Prefecture, Japan) is a Japanese politician who has served as a member of the House of Councillors of Japan since 2010. He represents the National proportional representation block and is a member of the Liberal Democratic Party.

He is a member of the following committees (as of 2021):

 Committee on Foreign Affairs and Defense
 Committee on Fundamental National Policies

References 

Members of the House of Councillors (Japan)
1974 births
Living people
Liberal Democratic Party (Japan) politicians